Namli is a surname. Notable persons with that surname include:

 Erhan Namlı (born 1974), Turkish footballer
 Mehdi Namli (born 1987), Moroccan footballer
 Younes Namli (born 1994), Danish footballer

Arabic-language surnames
Turkish-language surnames